Auf und davon – Mein Auslandstagebuch (Up and Away - My Diary Abroad) is a German documentary television series, broadcast on VOX since 16 April 2007. The television series is in the format of docu-soaps covering young people who leave for the first time in their lives their family, friends and home to spend some time in foreign countries. The participants relate their experiences and impressions with a handheld camera.

Plot 
The TV series belongs to the docu-soap format. In the series Auf und davon - Mein Auslandstagebuch (Up and Away - My Diary Abroad), VOX accompanies young people who leave their families, friends and home country for the first time in their lives to spend some time abroad. It also accompanies teenagers or young adults who are visiting Germans for a few months. The participants record their experiences and impressions with a handheld camera.

See also
List of German television series

External links
 

German documentary television series
2007 German television series debuts
2010s German television series
German-language television shows